Brachyplatys is a genus of shield bugs belonging to the family Plataspidae.

Species
 Brachyplatys biroi Montandon, 1900 
 Brachyplatys caeruleatus Montandon, 1896 
 Brachyplatys capito Montandon, 1894 
 Brachyplatys funebris Distant, 1901 
 Brachyplatys pacifica Dallas, 1851 
 Brachyplatys punctipes Montandon, 1894
 Brachyplatys subaeneus (Westwood, 1837)
 Brachyplatys vahlii (Fabricius, 1787)

References

Shield bugs
Pentatomomorpha genera